Newman College is a pre-K–12 co-educational Catholic school which operates in the Marist tradition in Churchlands, Western Australia. It is currently a joint governed college with the governors being the Archbishop of Perth, Barry Hickey, and the Provincial of the Marist Brothers of the Southern Province of Australia, Brother Paul Gilchrist. The college is a foundation member of the Association of Marist Schools of Australia (AMSA).

Name 
The college name is derived from that of the English scholar and philosopher, Saint John Henry Newman (1801–1890), a man who spent half of his life an Anglican and the latter half a Catholic.

Location 
As of 19 October 2019, the current college enrolment numbers are 1,900 and students are split across three campuses. The Kindergarten to Year 2 students are located on the Marian Campus in Floreat, the year 3-6 students are located on the Lavalla Campus in Churchlands and the year 7-12 students on the Marcellin Campus in Churchlands.

Primary 
The Primary part of Newman College is situated on two campuses.

Marian Campus, catering for students in pre-kindergarten to Year 2.

The Lavalla Campus at Churchlands caters for years 3 to 6, is adjacent to the Marcellin Campus.

Capital Development 
The College is Currently (as of 2023) undergoing an upgrade to their Lavalla campus to unify all Primary School Students to that campus, and all students PK-12 to the Churchlands Site. The Project is estimated to be completed in 2024 and will Follow the College's New Building Design Started with the John Henry Newman Learning Hub.

Secondary 
Year 7 is the first year for students who move from primary to secondary. Along with those who come from the primary school are those who come from the multiple feeder schools. The secondary campus of Newman College is the Marcellin Campus. it is on the western side of the site on which both the Lavalla and Marcellin Campuses are located. The Marcellin campus is served by public transport and school buses.

The school started construction on a revamped learning Hub at the end of 2019 and was finished 2021 at the start of the school year.

Capital Development 
At the start of Term 3 2021 the Brand-New John Henry Newman Learning hub building was destroyed by flooding water due to poor construction and cheap material used in the building, The Building has since completed its repairs (as of early 2022). 

In late 2022, The College announced renovation for the "N Block" part of the school to make it look like "S Block" and "JHN Block". Renovations Were completed by Early 2023.

Academic status

Grounds and Facilities

Ovals 
All the College's Ovals are used for Both PE Class, and out-of-school activities.

The Marian Campus has 1 soccer field located adjacent to the main building. This oval is currently being dug up for renovations.

The Marcellin and Lavalla Campuses have a combined 4 ovals:

John Lucas Oval 
Newman College's Cricket Ground, located Adjacent to the Sports Complex/Gym, and Terrance Gleeson Oval. On the Corner of Dolomite Ct and Tuscany Way. The Field is also Utilised for Hockey, Soccer, and other sports.

Terrance Gleeson Oval 
A Full-Size Australian Rules Football Field and Running Track. Located adjacent to the John Lucas Oval and the Marist Auditorium.

Frank Ehlers Pool 
The College's Heated Olympic Sized Swimming Pool. Used for Summer PE Swimming lessons, primary school swimming carnivals, etc...

Marist Auditorium 
The Marist Auditorium is a 600-seat mixed used performing arts venue.

The College uses the Venue for Exams, Assemblies, and their Various school Productions.

The College also allow the use of the venue, and venue staff to external events, usually dance recitals, seminars, etc...

Newman Sports Association 
The Newman Sports Association, or 'NSA' as it is often referred to as, is an Association of 8 clubs that utilise Newman College's various ovals, pools, courts, and other facilities. The Clubs are community based, primarily servicing the Newman College Community, but extends much further beyond. The Clubs are:

 Marist Football Club
 Subiaco Marist Cricket Club
 Newman Knights Hockey Club
 Newman Sienna Netball Club
 Newman Junior Netball Club
 Newman Holy Rosary Raiders Basketball Club
 Newman Water Polo Association
 Newman Churchlands Swimming Club

Marist Football Club 
Marist Football Club Logo the Marist Football Club (MFC) is an Australian rules football club, servicing boys and girls from as young as Pre-Primary age through to Year 2 in the Auskick program, from Year 3 through to Year 6 for Juniors and from Year 7 through to Year 12 for Youth Football.

Subiaco Marist Cricket Club 

Subiaco Marist Cricket Club (SMCC) is a cricket club based in Churchlands, Western Australia. The club fields men's teams in the Western Australian Suburban Turf Cricket Association (WASTCA) and women's teams in Western Australian Cricket Association (WACA) Female Club Cricket competition.

Newman Knights Hockey Club 
The Newman Knights Hockey Club, or commonly just referred to as 'Knights or "The Knights",''' is a hockey club founded in 1922 in New Norcia, In the '60s they relocated to Churchlands. "Today the Newman Knights Hockey Club has 16 sides competing in the WA Hockey Association competition in Men’s, Women’s, Juniors, and Masters.

The Club Trains on the John Lucas oval at the Marcellin Campus.

The Club often holds many community events, fundraisers, and quiz nights for members.

 Newman Sienna Netball Club 
Newman Sienna Netball Club is a Club that has been operating since 1989.

The Club participates in the Perth Netball Association competition along with other local clubs.

The Club Trains at the Newman College Netball Courts and plays competitive games at the State Netball Centre in Jolimont, Western Australia.

 Newman Junior Netball Club 
The Newman Junior Netball Club (NJNC'')is the Sienna Netball Club Equivalent for Years 2-6.

It was "established to promote, encourage and manage the game of netball for children in years 2 to 6 in the Churchlands and surrounding areas. NJNC is affiliated with Netball WA and Perth Netball Association. The season runs from May to August. Games are played at Matthews Netball Centre Jolimont and training is held at Newman College Churchlands."

The Club is usually the 'first step' for many players, with the sienna club being a good progression on the program.

Newman Holy Rosary Raiders Basketball Club 
One of the largest clubs in the district, The Newman Holy Rosary Raiders Basketball Club, founded in 1987 when two teams from Holy Rosary School were entered into the Perry Lakes Basketball competition.

A few years later, teams from Newman College entered the club, followed by teams from Holy Spirit School and Woodlands Primary School.

The Club participates in the Perry Lakes Hawks Basketball Association. All games are played at the WA Basketball Centre

Newman Water Polo Association Club 
The Newman Water Polo Association Club was "Formed in 2008 by a group of interested parents from Newman College with the objective to provide opportunities for students to learn or further their interest in playing water polo irrespective of their experience and ability."

It uses the Frank Ehlers Pool at the Marcellin campus for training.

Other community events are held at the pool or at the NSA Hall located in the Sports Complex on Tuscany Way.

Newman Churchlands Swimming Club 
Newman Churchlands Swim Club (NCSC) is a community-based sports organisation providing squad training and swimming lessons for swimmers of all levels, from leisure and fitness through to competition level.

They were Founded in 1976, the oldest of the NSA clubs, and a Year older than the College Itself.

They Train and primarily operate out of the Frank Ehlers Pool at Newman College.

Notable alumni

 Frank Borzage - Australian film maker and actor
 Matthew Connell - Australian rules footballer
 Danny Green - professional boxer
 Jesse Hogan - Australian rules footballer
 Justin Langer - former test cricketer (also attended Aquinas College)
 Barry Marshall - joint winner of the 2005 Nobel Prize in Medicine
 David McAllister - former artistic director and principal dancer of The Australian Ballet
 Daniel Ricciardo - Formula One driver
 Samantha Roscoe - basketball player
 Alec Waterman - Australian rules footballer
 Jake Waterman - Australian rules footballer

See also 
 List of schools in the Perth metropolitan area
Subiaco Marist Cricket Club, headquartered at Newman College
 https://thewest.com.au/news/education/newman-college-bans-19-year-12-students-from-school-ball-over-muck-up-day-mayhem-ng-b881676098z
https://www.watoday.com.au/national/western-australia/father-joe-s-death-is-macabre-curiosity-being-mistaken-for-public-interest-20190623-p520hm.html
https://eminetra.com.au/perth-relief-teacher-and-footy-coach-facing-child-exploitation-material-charges/48557/
https://thewest.com.au/news/education/why-was-catholic-school-system-splintering-over-governance-dispute--c-5868044

References

External links 

Junior School Heads Association of Australia Member Schools in Western Australia
Association of Marist Schools of Australia
Catholic primary schools in Perth, Western Australia
Catholic secondary schools in Perth, Western Australia
1977 establishments in Australia
Educational institutions established in 1977